For the 1995 Rugby World Cup in South Africa, the Oceania teams from ,  and  were granted automatic entry due to reaching the quarter-final stages of the 1991 tournament.

Each team lost their home match, but Tonga won the play-off on aggregate score.

Match results
Tonga qualified as Oceania 1 for the 1995 Rugby World Cup, winning 34–26 on aggregate.

References

1993 in Oceanian rugby union
1995
Oceania
1995 rugby union tournaments for national teams
1993 in Tongan sport
1993 in Fijian rugby union
Fiji national rugby union team matches
Tonga national rugby union team matches
International rugby union competitions hosted by Fiji
International rugby union competitions hosted by Tonga